This is a list of the extreme points of Slovakia: the points that are farther north, south, east or west than any other location, as well as the highest and lowest points.

Latitude and longitude 

 North: near Oravská Polhora 
 South: Patince
 West: near Záhorská Ves 
 East: Nová Sedlica

The distance between Záhorská Ves (the westernmost point) and Nová Sedlica (the easternmost point) is 428 km.

Altitude 
 Maximum: Gerlachovský štít, High Tatras (2655 m)
 Minimum: Streda nad Bodrogom (94 m)

Other features 
 Longest river: Vah (402,5 km).
 Deepest mountain lake: Velke Hincove pleso, High Tatras (53 m deep, 20 hectares)
 Uppermost mountain lake: Modre pleso, High Tatras (2157 m above sea level)

See also 
 Extreme points of Europe
 Extreme points of Earth

References

Lists of coordinates
Slovakia
Extreme